Papaipema beeriana, known generally as blazing star borer moth, is a species of cutworm or dart moth in the family Noctuidae. Other common names include the blazing star stem borer, liatris borer moth, and oriental sea-kale. It is found in North America.

The MONA or Hodges number for Papaipema beeriana is 9508.

References

Further reading

 
 
 

Papaipema
Articles created by Qbugbot
Moths described in 1923